Cheerful Weather for the Wedding is a 2012 British comedy-drama film, directed by Donald Rice and starring Felicity Jones, Luke Treadaway, and Elizabeth McGovern. Adapted from the 1932 novella Cheerful Weather for the Wedding by Julia Strachey of the Bloomsbury Group, the film is about a young woman on her wedding day who worries that she's about to marry the wrong man, while both her fiancé and her former lover grow increasingly anxious about the event. The film premiered at the Tribeca Film Festival on 20 April 2012.

Plot
Today is Dolly's (Felicity Jones) wedding day, and her family is arriving at the manor house with all the cheerfulness, chaos and petty grievances that bubble to the surface at such gatherings. Trouble soon appears with the arrival of Joseph (Luke Treadaway), Dolly's lover from the previous summer, who throws her feelings into turmoil. To her mother's (Elizabeth McGovern) exasperation, his presence threatens to upset the design she had for her daughter's future. Dolly, for her part, just can't decide whether to run away with Joseph or start a new life in Argentina with her husband to be.

Cast
 Felicity Jones as Dolly Thatcham
 Luke Treadaway as Joseph Patten
 Elizabeth McGovern as Mrs. Thatcham
 Mackenzie Crook as David Daken
Fenella Woolgar as Nancy Daken
 Eva Traynor as Annie 
 Zoe Tapper as Evelyn Graham
 Paola Dionisotti as Mrs. Whitstable
 James Norton as Owen
 Sophie Stanton as Millman
 Elizabeth Webster as Betty
 Kenneth Collard as Whitstable
 Ellie Kendrick as Kitty Thatcham 
 Ben Greaves-Neil as Jimmy Daken
 Luke Ward-Wilkinson as Robert
 Olly Alexander as Tom
 Joanna Hole as Miss Spoon
 John Standing as Horace Spigott

References

External links
 Movie trailer
 

2012 films
British comedy-drama films
Films based on British novels
2012 comedy-drama films
2010s English-language films
2010s British films